Proteiniclasticum is a strictly anaerobic and proteolytic genus of bacteria from the family of Clostridiaceae with one known species (Proteiniclasticum ruminis). Proteiniclasticum ruminis has been isolated from the content of a yak rumen.

References

Clostridiaceae
Bacteria genera
Monotypic bacteria genera
Taxa described in 2010